The quad singles event at the 2012 Paralympic Games took place from 2 to 8 September, at Eton Manor, London.

Calendar

Seeds

Draw

Key

INV = Bipartite invitation
ITF = ITF place
ALT = Alternate
r = Retired
w/o = Walkover

References 
 
 

Quad singles